Udanta Singh Kumam (born 14 June 1996), is an Indian professional footballer who plays as a forward for Indian Super League club Bengaluru FC and the India national team.

Club career

Early career
Born in Manipur, Singh started his youth career at the Tata Football Academy. While at TFA, Singh shined at the academy during the Darjeeling Gold Cup, Saras Gold Cup, and the I-League U19 in 2014. He also represented the state of Jharkhand during the 2011 National Games of India. Singh also represented India during the Nike All Asia Camp in Australia, which he, and his teammate Alen Deory, were selected for the All-Star team. Singh left Tata Football Academy, after helping his side win the 2014 I-League U19, and in the process, he became the golden-boot winner with his nine goals during the tournament.

Bengaluru FC
On 15 July 2014 it was announced that Singh had signed a professional contract with Bengaluru the reigning champions of the I-League, the topmost professional league in India. He made his debut for the side during the Durand Cup on 30 October 2014 against Mohammedan. He came off the bench for the start of the second half and played the full half as Bengaluru FC won the match 2–1. He then made his professional debut during the same tournament at the semi-final stage when Bengaluru FC took on Salgaocar. He once again came off the bench and scored his penalty during the penalty shoot-out but could not help his teams cause as Bengaluru FC fell on penalties 4–5. Udanta made his I-League debut in a 4–1 win against Sporting Goa on 31 March 2015, coming on as a substitute for Sean Rooney. Udanta assisted skipper Sunil Chhetri for the winner in an AFC Cup group stage game against Maldivian side Maziya on 28 April 2015, thus becoming the youngest Indian player to provide an assist in AFC competitions. He scored his first goal for Bengaluru on 12 May 2015 in an AFC Cup game, where he opened the scoring in an eventual 3–1 defeat to Persipura Jayapura, thus becoming the youngest Indian goal scorer in AFC Cup.

After the season ended, Singh was rewarded with a two-year contract extension. Udanta was excluded from the 2015 Indian Super League draft by Bengaluru FC, opting to send him on a training stint at English club Oxford United in the EFL League 2.

Udanta scored his first I-League goal of the 2015–16 season on 2 March 2016 against Shillong Lajong, in a game where he was adjudged the man of the match.

In the first league game of the 2016–17 season Udanta scored twice as Bengaluru beat Shillong Lajong 3–0. Afterwards Udanta was named man of the match with his second goals being described as a "beautiful volley." He was also named as player of the week by a newspaper for his performance in that match.

Udanta scored a goal and assisted 7 times for Bengaluru during the 2017–18 Indian Super League season during which his team finished as runners-up. He also was a regular for his team during the AFC Cup where he scored once. For the 2018–19 ISL season, Singh scored 5 times and assisted thrice as his team ran out champions of the tournament. He scored a goal in the 2018 AFC Cup as well.

International

Udanta was selected to join the India U19 team in 2013 for the AFC U-19 Championship qualification where he started all 4 of India's matches, scoring once against Turkmenistan U19s. Udanta had his senior debut on 24 March 2016 in a qualifying match against Iran.

On 1 June 2018, he scored his first goal in India's 5–0 victory over Chinese Taipei.

Career statistics

Stats

International goals

Honours

India
 SAFF Championship: 2021
 Intercontinental Cup: 2018
 King's Cup third place: 2019

India U23
 South Asian Games Silver medal: 2016

Tata Football Academy
 I-League U19 (1): 2014

Bengaluru FC
 Federation Cup (2): 2014–15, 2016–17
 I-League (1): 2015–16
 AFC Cup: Runner-up 2016
 Super Cup: 2018
 Indian Super League(1): 2018-19
 Durand Cup: 2022

Individual
 Tata Football Academy Best Gentleman Cadet
 FPAI Young Player of the Year: 2015–16

References

1996 births
Living people
Indian footballers
Bengaluru FC players
I-League players
Association football forwards
Footballers from Manipur
India youth international footballers
India international footballers
2019 AFC Asian Cup players
Indian Super League players
Mumbai City FC players
South Asian Games silver medalists for India
South Asian Games medalists in football